Cwmbran Central is a community in the new town of Cwmbran, Torfaen, South Wales. It had a population of 9,947 as of the 2011 United Kingdom census.

References 

Communities in Torfaen